The great spinetail (Synallaxis hypochondriaca) is a species of bird in the family Furnariidae.  It is endemic to Peru where its natural habitat is Mediterranean-type shrubby vegetation. It is threatened by habitat loss.

This species was formerly considered monotypic within the genus Siptornopsis but molecular phylogenetic studies have shown that it is embedded within Synallaxis.

References

External links
BirdLife Species Factsheet.

Synallaxis
Birds of the Peruvian Andes
Endemic birds of Peru
great spinetail
great spinetail
Taxonomy articles created by Polbot